Stenocercus santander is a species of lizard of the Tropiduridae family. It is found in Colombia.

References

santander
Reptiles described in 2007
Reptiles of Colombia
Endemic fauna of Colombia